Akersville Road is a locally maintained road located in Macon County in Middle Tennessee and in Allen and Monroe counties in South Central Kentucky. The Tennessee section of the road is maintained by the Macon County Highway Department, while the Kentucky section of the road is maintained by the Kentucky Transportation Cabinet. County road logs identify this road as CR 1054.

Route description
The road begins at a junction with traffic light on Tennessee State Route 10 (SR 10, Scottsville Road), and turns at the corner of Coolidge Road and Sneed Boulevard. After the left turn, it follows a north-northeasterly path and ends at the Kentucky state line, where it becomes Section A of Kentucky Route 87 (KY 87), still bearing the Akersville Road name, into Allen and Monroe counties in South Central Kentucky.

Major intersections

Related routes
Tennessee State Route 261 (Galen Road) connects the Lafayette area to become Section B of KY 87 (Bugtussle Road) at the state line near Gamaliel, Kentucky

See also

References

Transportation in Macon County, Tennessee
Transportation in Allen County, Kentucky
Transportation in Monroe County, Kentucky